Talk is the fourteenth studio album by the English progressive rock band Yes. It was released on 21 March 1994 by Victory Music, and is their last studio album to feature guitarist Trevor Rabin and keyboardist Tony Kaye.

After Yes completed the Union Tour in 1992, record label manager and longtime Yes associate Phil Carson approached Rabin to record a new Yes album for Victory, his newly established independent label, with the band's most commercially successful line-up of Kaye, frontman Jon Anderson, bassist Chris Squire, and drummer Alan White. Rabin dedicated time to write songs with Anderson, as the singer had been kept away from the initial songwriting sessions in the past which caused internal friction. Talk is noted for being amongst the first albums to be digitally recorded and edited in its entirety without using traditional audio tape.

Talk fell short of commercial expectations upon release, reaching number 20 in the UK and number 33 in the US. Victory Music went bankrupt at the same time, which affected the album's potential for success. In addition, the album received mixed to poor reviews from critics. "The Calling" and "Walls" were released as singles that charted at No. 3 and 24 on the US Billboard Hot Mainstream Rock chart, respectively. Yes supported the album with a 1994 tour which featured future Yes member Billy Sherwood on additional guitars and keyboards. Rabin and Kaye left the group at its conclusion.

Background and writing
In March 1992, Yes completed their Union Tour which had eight band members on stage: singer Jon Anderson, bassist Chris Squire, guitarists Steve Howe and Trevor Rabin, drummers Bill Bruford and Alan White, and keyboardists Tony Kaye and Rick Wakeman. For the band's next project Phil Carson, a former Atlantic Records executive and longtime associate of the band, approached Rabin to produce a Yes album for Victory Music, his new independent label that he formed while he worked with JVC. Carson wished for Rabin to make it with the 1983–88 line-up of Rabin, Anderson, Squire, White, and Kaye, the same group that made the most commercially successful Yes albums, 90125 (1983) and Big Generator (1987). As Rabin and Wakeman had got on well during the Union Tour, Carson suggested Wakeman be involved as well. Howe thought it was "silly" of Carson wanting to have Yes continue as a group minus Bruford and himself, and the pair resumed their solo careers. By mid-1993, Wakeman withdrew his involvement as Carson and Yes manager Tony Dimitriades required him to cut all ties with his own management, which Wakeman was not prepared to do.

With a recording deal secured, Rabin joined Anderson in a motel in San Clemente, California where Anderson had been staying, to write new material. During the next two or so weeks they came up with a group of songs either from scratch or ideas that they had both put down for potential development, using an acoustic guitar and two boomboxes for putting down what they came up with. This occasion marked the first time Anderson had been involved in the songwriting for a Yes album from its initial stages since his return to the group in 1983, as his involvement on previous records came at the latter stages of production, which limited his input. Rabin knew the importance of forming a strong musical bond with Anderson for Talk as on Big Generator, he felt "the frustration in Jon that, although he was involved, it was basically me writing the songs and Jon trying to work on top of them [...] So I realised, the best possible way is [...] I need to work really closely with him to provide him the best possible platform to sing on [...] which led to its being a better album for us". Anderson noted that having such an instant collaboration with a songwriter in the band makes "a true Yes album", and recalled that the album's direction was set after four days of writing which was to include one long track. Squire made a conscious decision to reduce his involvement in the songwriting to ensure Rabin and Anderson came up with strong enough material that they were happy with, although he is credited as a co-writer on "The Calling" and "Real Love". Squire too, was "very happy" with the material on the album. Among the early working titles of Talk were Blueprint and Crunching Numbers.

Recording

The majority of Talk was recorded and mixed at Rabin's home studio in Hollywood, California which he named The Jacaranda Room. Additional recording took place at A&M Recording Studios in Hollywood. Rabin took charge of the album's production and opted for digital non-linear recording and editing over traditional tape, which allowed for audio tracks to be saved onto a hard drive in real time. He recalled: "Everyone thought I was nuts – but the band was great, very supportive", and they agreed to pursue it. Rabin said that Kaye was particularly enthusiastic and supportive in making the album, and described his role like "almost as a kind of co-producer". Although Kaye is credited to just playing the Hammond organ, Rabin said "his input was a lot more".

After a period of research, Rabin and his engineer and mixer Michael Jay linked four Apple Macintosh computers to a single IBM machine, each running the digital audio workstation software Digital Performer developed by Mark of the Unicorn, and saved onto Dynatec hard drives. As they worked on the album Rabin and Jay noted errors they encountered, or suggested new functions they needed to complete the recording process, to which the programmers would implement the desired changes and update the studio's software accordingly. Anderson said that such teething problems with the software was why Talk took so long to finish. Despite this setback, Rabin said that the ability to edit tracks digitally resulted in fewer takes from the band which kept the songs fresh.

Rabin clarified that the album features live instrumentation from the band throughout, as the idea of recording onto a computer had some people incorrectly assume that it was computerised music. He also noted that Squire became frustrated with the digital recording process and the problems it caused, but the bassist later said he preferred the sound of his bass from recording digitally over the digital tape he had used previously. He played his Rickenbacker bass, a Tobias four-string bass, a custom made Mouradian bass, and Rabin's Casio computer guitar fed through a synthesiser. An initial hard drive with 5.5 GB of memory soon became insufficient as an estimated 27 microphones were used to capture White's drums in real time, which led to the decision to dedicate more tracks for the drums in the final mix, rather than condensing them. Until that point, each song was roughly 350 MB in size. In its unedited form, the album took up over 34 GB of memory. Production halted briefly following the Northridge, California earthquake in January 1994 in order to protect the equipment from subsequent tremors. The album was mastered by Stephen Marcussen at Precision Mastering in Los Angeles.

Artwork
The album's cover was designed by German-American graphic artist Peter Max. Squire held some reservations about the design, despite the art having grown on him since he first saw it. The album's sleeve contains the message "dedicated to all Yes fans", along with the tongue-in-cheek warning: "P.S. 'Caution' Extreme Digital Dynamic Range", signifying that the album is a fully digital recording. Early pressings contained a misprint in the credits which originally had all songs credited solely to Anderson and Rabin.

Songs
"The Calling" developed and evolved around the song's introductory guitar riff. The song has been described as featuring a modern sound, with heavy focus on Rabin's guitars, and a three-part vocal harmony featuring Anderson, Rabin and Squire. Rabin did not wish to make the song have a "preaching" message, but as a call for people to get together with one another. According to Anderson, the song's lyrics were inspired by the concept of "local history", the current three-thousand year window of history, outside of which mankind has little visibility or understanding.

Rabin developed "I Am Waiting" with ease and little effort, taking him one day to put the music together. He remembered Anderson took an instant liking towards it, writing the lyrics and singing most of the vocals on the same day. Anderson singled out "I Am Waiting" as a favourite, described the song as "real pure music" because of the spontaneous way it was written.

The music to "Real Love" was mainly written by Squire; Kaye described it as "pretty heavy". The lyrics were partly inspired by Rabin's reading of A Brief History of Time by British physicist Stephen Hawking ("Far away in the depths of Hawking's mind...").

"State of Play" originated from an incident where an emergency services vehicle passed Rabin with its siren on. He recalled about the sound of its siren: "I thought that's an amazing sound with the Doppler effect and everything as it goes by. That gave me the idea for the screeching kind of guitar sound in the beginning". Speaking about its tune, Squire thought the track was a "conscious effort" from the band to combine a style of hip-hop "groove with heavy rock guitars". White pointed out the singing from Anderson, Rabin, and Squire as particularly strong, with "great musicianship all round".

"Walls" was the last track produced for the album. Rabin co-wrote the song with Supertramp vocalist Roger Hodgson, who declined an offer to be Yes's lead singer following Anderson's departure in 1988 following the Big Generator tour. The pair recorded a demo in 1990 which was included on Rabin's demo compilation album 90124, released in 2003.

"Where Will You Be" is a song written by Rabin, originally as the signature tune to an Australian film. He thought Anderson's lyrics were some of the best on Talk. An instrumental version can be found on Rabin's 90124 demo album.

"Endless Dream" is a fifteen-minute track divided into three parts, "Silent Spring", "Talk", and "Endless Dream". The repeating piano riff at the beginning of "Silent Spring" came from a longer piece that Rabin intended to use as part of a film score, but chose to use it for the song instead. The piece then moves into a 5/4 time signature. A "dreamy" instrumental section on "Talk" was originally a piece Rabin wrote for orchestra titled "October", but was repurposed in a "more synthetic" way on the album proper. Anderson said the song is "as good as anything" the band has done and noted its "remarkable" structure in the "Endless Dream" section, rating it on par with "Close to the Edge" and "Awaken", two long Yes tracks from the 1970s. White also praised the track highly.

Release
On 16 March 1994, Yes held a Talk premiere party radio broadcast hosted by Bob Coburn at the Hard Rock in Hollywood, California. This was followed by a release party broadcast on 21 March. The album was a mild commercial success, reaching No. 20 in the UK and No. 33 in the US, their lowest charting album in the US since The Yes Album in 1971. Anderson and Rabin blamed the bankruptcy of the Victory label which caused a lack of promotion. Two tracks were released as singles—"The Calling" and "Walls"; peaking at No. 3 and 24 respectively on Billboard Hot Mainstream Rock Tracks chart. Carson spoke of the album following its release: "[It] was probably one of the best albums they have ever done ... But of course it was totally at the wrong time. It sold around 300,000 around the world but nothing like that it should have."

In November 1994, Yes released Yes Active, a CD-ROM containing the album and various interactive bonus material including interviews and band performances.

Talk was reissued as a Collector's Edition in April 2002 by Spitfire Records, which included "Endless Dream" as a single track, a version of "The Calling" titled "The Calling (Special Version)", and a set of sleeve notes by journalist and Yes biographer Chris Welch. In 2006, Talk was released as part of the Yes album compilation box set Essentially Yes (2006) on Eagle Records.

Reception

Talk received a mostly negative response from critics. Rolling Stone rated it two stars out of five. Critic J. D. Considine reviewed the album in Musician with "Shut up." Rabin spoke of his review: "I laughed at first ... But then I thought a review like that doesn't do anybody any good. We all get negative reviews of albums, and if the criticism is negative, and if it's constructive criticism, often it's something you can feed off". Tom Sinclair of Entertainment Weekly gave the album a C- and criticised "the annoying castrati vocals, the bombastic arena-rock flourishes, the cloying New Age sentiments" and "the sterile classicism".

In a retrospective review, Steven McDonald of AllMusic rated Talk three stars out of five, and praised the "new attitude powering the band, and a few surprises hidden away in the songs". According to him, "this album is fun and extremely well done" and it "has some really nifty songs that stick in the mind, from the opening 'The Calling' to the closing 16-minute 'Endless Dream.

Tour
Talk was supported with the 77-date tour of North and South America and Japan, between 18 June and 11 October 1994. It featured American musician Billy Sherwood on additional guitars, keyboards, and bass on certain dates. Sherwood would later become a full-time member of Yes from 1997 to 2000, and from 2015 to the present. Rabin supervised the development of Concertsonics, a quadraphonic sound system that allowed people seated in selected seats to hear the concert's soundboard mix with headphones and personal radio by tuning into a specific FM frequency. Rabin was pleased with the band's performances, describing the tour as his "most satisfying" with the band. The tour included a performance of "Walls" on Late Show with David Letterman on 20 June 1994. According to Rabin, host David Letterman "was driving one day and 'The Calling' ... came on the radio. He stopped the car and apparently called his producer to get the album". After the tour, Rabin and Kaye left the band.

Track listing
Taken from the sleeve notes:

Personnel
Taken from the sleeve notes.

Yes
Jon Anderson – vocals
Trevor Rabin – guitars, keyboards, vocals, programming
Chris Squire – bass guitar, vocals
Tony Kaye – Hammond organ
Alan White – drums

Production
Trevor Rabin – production, engineering
Michael Jay – engineering
Stephen Marcussen – mastering at Precision Mastering, Los Angeles, California
Jim Baldree – mastering editor
Paul Rivas – art direction
Peter Max – original logo

Chart performance

References 
Notes

Citations

Sources

Yes (band) albums
1994 albums
Victory Records albums
Albums produced by Trevor Rabin